A plank is timber that is flat, elongated, and rectangular with parallel faces that are higher and longer than wide. Used primarily in carpentry, planks are critical in the construction of ships, houses, bridges, and many other structures. Planks also serve as supports to form shelves and tables.

Planks are often used as a work surface on elevated scaffolding, and need to be wide enough to provide strength without breaking when walked on.

A plank used in a building as a horizontal supporting member that runs between foundations, walls, or beams to support a ceiling or floor is called a joist.

The plank was the basis of maritime transport: wood floats on water, and abundant forests meant wooden logs could be easily obtained and processed, making planks the primary material in ship building. However, since the 20th century, wood has largely been supplanted in ship construction by iron and steel, to decrease cost and improve durability.

Gallery

Coverboard 
A plank that covers a third rail as a protection for those who fall off a platform

See also 
 Lumber
 Plank cooking
 Walking the plank

References

Building materials
Shipbuilding